The Roman Catholic Diocese of Lafayette in Louisiana, officially the Diocese of Lafayette in Louisiana (Latin: Dioecesis Lafayettensis), is a diocese of the Catholic Church in the United States, and sui juris Latin Church in full communion with the pope of Rome. The Roman Catholic Diocese of Lafayette in Louisiana encompasses St. Landry, Evangeline, Lafayette, St. Martin, Iberia, St. Mary (except Morgan City, which is part of the Diocese of Houma-Thibodaux), Acadia, and Vermilion parishes in southcentral Louisiana. The diocese includes the heart of Cajun Louisiana (Acadiana) and is divided into four deaneries.

History 

Pope Benedict XV erected the Diocese of Lafayette in Louisiana on January 11, 1918, with territory taken from the Roman Catholic Archdiocese of New Orleans, designating Saint John's Church in Lafayette as the cathedral of the new diocese and making it a suffragan of the same metropolitan archdiocesan see. On January 29, 1980, Pope John Paul II erected the Roman Catholic Diocese of Lake Charles, assigning approximately the western half of the original territory of the Diocese of Lafayette in Louisiana to the new diocese and making the new diocese also a suffragan of the Roman Catholic Archdiocese of New Orleans.

In 1974, Bishop Gerard Frey assigned Gilbert Gauthe as a Boy Scout chaplain despite the fact that Gauthe had previously come to Frey's attention for having molested altar boys. Gauthe was stripped of his priestly duties after more allegations of sexual misconduct surfaced in 1983. Bishop Frey was criticized for his handling of Gauthe's case, and in 1985 expressed his regret, saying, "I ask for the prayers and understanding of all our people and of all people of good will of every faith and belief. I deeply regret and am distressed by the suffering that has taken place because of the tragic events in the diocese over the past several years." In total, the diocese settled for more than $20 million in lawsuits involving Gauthe. Gauthe was later jailed for violating the Texas sex offender registration law and released in April 2010.

In 1986, diocese priest Robert Lane Fontenot was convicted of sexually abusing three children and received a sentence of one year in prison and two years of probation and forced residence at Jemez Springs, New Mexico.

In 2008, the diocese agreed to pay a financial settlement to a former altar boy who claimed diocese priest Valerie Pullman had sexually abused him in 1972. Pullman later died in 2017 after being accused as early as 1966 of sexually abusing children at different parishes in the diocese. In October 2018, former Acadiana priest Felix David Broussard received a five year prison sentence after pleading guilty to possession of child pornography.

On March 29, 2019, former Morrow priest Michael Guirdy plead to committing acts of child molestation while serving in the Diocese of Lafayette in Louisiana. He had surrendered to police in June 2018 after he was charged and began serving time in prison. On April 30, 2019, Guidry received a seven-year prison sentence. In April 2019, the Diocese of Lafayette in Louisiana released a list of 33 clergy who were "credibly accused" of committing acts of sex abuse while serving in the diocese.

Bishops
The following lists ordinaries (bishops and archbishops of the diocese) and auxiliary bishops, and their years of service. They are followed by other priests of this diocese who became bishops.

Bishops of Lafayette in Louisiana
 Jules Jeanmard (1918-1956)
 Maurice Schexnayder (1956-1972)
 Gerard Louis Frey (1972-1989)
 Harry Joseph Flynn (1989-1994), appointed Coadjutor Archbishop of Saint Paul and Minneapolis and subsequently succeeded to that see
 Edward Joseph O'Donnell (1994-2002)
 Charles Michael Jarrell (2002-2016)
 J. Douglas Deshotel (2016–present)

Former auxiliary bishops
 Maurice Schexnayder (1951-1956), appointed bishop in Lafayette
 Robert Emmet Tracy (1959-1961), appointed Bishop of Baton Rouge
 Warren Louis Boudreaux (1962-1971), appointed Bishop of Beaumont, later Bishop of Houma-Thibodaux

Other priests of the diocese who became bishops
The following served as priests in Lafayette before being appointed bishops elsewhere:
 Jude Speyrer, appointed Bishop of Lake Charles in 1980
Sam Joseph Galip Jacobs (priest in Lafayette, 1964-1980), appointed Bishop of Alexandria in 1989
 Glen Provost, appointed Bishop of Lake Charles in 2007

Landmarks

The oldest church in the diocese is the parish church of St. Martinville, dating back to 1765.

High schools
Academy of the Sacred Heart, Grand Coteau
Catholic High School, New Iberia
Hanson Memorial High School, Franklin
Notre Dame High School, Crowley
Opelousas Catholic School, Opelousas
Sacred Heart High School, Ville Platte
St. Edmund High School, Eunice
St. Thomas More High School, Lafayette
Teurlings Catholic High School, Lafayette
Vermilion Catholic High School, Abbeville

Ecclesiastical province of New Orleans
See: List of the Catholic bishops of the United States#Province of New Orleans

Notes

External links
Roman Catholic Diocese of Lafayette in Louisiana Official Site
Brief description of the Cathedral of St. John the Evangelist 
Photos of the Cathedral of St. John the Evangelist

 
Catholic Church in Louisiana
Culture of Lafayette, Louisiana
Lafayette Louisiana
Christian organizations established in 1918
1918 establishments in Louisiana
Lafayette